The Complete History is a compilation album released by 2 Unlimited on February 9, 2004 through ZYX Music label The record was released in two formats: as a single CD edition, and as a CD/DVD packaged in a DVD case. The package was released in Germany, and then in Brazil in 2005.

Track listing

CD
Tribal Dance (Rap Edit) (3:41) 
No Limit (Radio Edit) (3:16) 
The Real Thing (Radio Edit) (3:40) 
Faces (Radio Edit) (3:32) 
Twilight Zone (7" Vocal) (4:09) 
Maximum Overdrive (Radio Edit) (3:42) 
Let The Beat Control Your Body (Airplay Edit) (3:40) 
Get Ready For This (Radio Edit) (3:44)
No One (Radio Edit) (3:27) 
Shelter For A Rainy Day (Extended Mix) (5:14) 
Desire (Album Version) (4:24) 
Eternally Yours (Album Version) (4:24) 
Tribal Dance 2.4 (Revil O. Remix) (7:33) 
No Limit 2.3 (Master Blaster Remix) (5:25) 
Murphys Megamix (Faces, Tribal Dance, Maximum Overdrive, Get Ready For This, No Limit) (6:25) 
Faces (Automatic Breakbeat Remix) (5:32)

DVD
No Limit (3:45) 
Faces (3:30) 
Maximum Overdrive (3:26) 
Let The Beat Control Your Body (3:43) 
The Real Thing (3:40) 
No One (3:27) 
Magic Friend (3:46) 
Workaholic (3:40) 
Get Ready For This (Orchestral Mix) (2:55) 
Tribal Dance (No Rap) (3:44) 
Nothing Like The Rain (4:01) 
Here I Go (3:18) 
Jump For Joy (3:42) 
Do What's Good For Me (3:52) 
Spread Your Love (3:43) 
No Limit 2.3 (3:10) 
"Countdown Special" (Bonus) (25:27)

References

2 Unlimited albums
2004 compilation albums